Galicija is a settlement in the Municipality of Žalec in east-central Slovenia. It lies in the Hudinja Hills north of Žalec. The area is part of the traditional region of Styria. The municipality is now included in the Savinja Statistical Region.

The parish church in the settlement is dedicated to Saint James and belongs to the Roman Catholic Diocese of Celje. It was built between 1772 and 1778 on the site of a 16th-century church.

References

External links
Galicija at Geopedia

Populated places in the Municipality of Žalec